John Mark Purdey (25 December 1953 – 12 November 2006) was an English organic farmer who came to public attention in the 1980s, when he began to circulate his own theories regarding the causes of bovine spongiform encephalopathy (BSE or "mad cow disease").

Investigations into BSE
Purdey's interest in the disease was triggered when four cows he purchased for his farm developed the disease, though no animal raised on his farm ever contracted it. He also became aware of a fact also considered by the Philips Inquiry: "1145. The practice in the UK of recycling animal protein as an ingredient of animal feed dates back to at least 1926. In the 1970s attention was directed within MAFF to the danger that this practice would result in the spread of infectious diseases. The diseases considered were those caused by conventional viral and bacterial organisms. No consideration appears to have been given to the risk that scrapie might be recycled in sheep, or even transmitted to other farm animals. This may seem surprising. The answer probably lies in the fact that half a century had elapsed without any indication that animal feed containing ovine protein was infecting sheep or any other animal." Purdey published a number of papers in which he set down his belief that BSE was a transmissible disease that had an environmental cause. He suggested this cause might be Phosmet, a systemic organophosphate insecticide that was being spread along the spines of intensively farmed cows to eradicate warble fly. Purdey believed that the chemicals, derived from military nerve gases, disturbed the balance of metals in the animals' brains, namely reducing copper and increasing manganese, giving rise to the misfolded proteins called prions that are regarded as the cause of BSE. Through the High Court, he successfully challenged the British government's compulsory warble fly eradication program, which would have compelled him to treat his own cattle with the insecticide.

The Phillips Inquiry rejected the original organophosphate hypothesis because the BSE epidemic continued even after phosmet use had become minimal yet most importantly because the original theory did not comport with the differences in BSE incidence between Guernsey and Jersey (opposite from what the original theory predicted).

In his later papers on BSE, Purdey suggested in his modified hypothesis that a combination of high manganese and low copper in the soil, together with high environmental oxidising agents, might "initiate a self-perpetuating free radical mediated neurodegenerative disease process (e.g., a TSE) in susceptible genotypes." He later speculated that Parkinson's and Alzheimer's may have similar biochemical triggers and pathways as transmissible spongiform encephalopathies (TSEs or prion diseases). His work was published in a number of minor peer-reviewed journals. He delivered lectures around the world to farmers and academics, and was invited to present his research to the British government's Phillips Inquiry into BSE. Purdey called himself an "underground scientist" and "eco detective." He received a number of awards from New Age and organic farming organisations.

Nonetheless, Purdey's views have not been accepted by mainstream scientists, mainly because official UK response to the epidemic conflates transmissibility with susceptibility. Yet the Phillips Inquiry has been reported as concluding that "[t]he theory that BSE is caused by the application to cattle of organophosphorus pesticides is not viable, although there is a possibility that these can increase the susceptibility of cattle to BSE." Australian and CDC reports differed in material aspects from the Phillips Inquiry by differentiating causation and susceptibility. An uncritiqued, unpublished report stated broadly that Purdey's modified hypothesis did not fit the spatial distribution of reported incidences, but did not have the precision to decisively confirm or deny the modified hypothesis. Purdey's scientific inquiries were based on his field work at outbreak hot spots worldwide and analysis of documentary evidence, thus his papers are mainly theoretical and contain no original biochemical clinical research. His modified theory awaits the results of future scientific inquiry.

One aspect of ongoing research has been an examination of the flawed official scientific reasoning during the UK BSE crisis. There is also bias in comprehending, interpreting and reporting the conclusions of Purdey, other scientists, and even the Phillips Inquiry (which actually stated: "1123. The theory that BSE was caused by a reaction to the use of organophosphorus compounds (OPs) poured on cattle as systemic pesticides cannot be reconciled with the epidemiology and is not supported by research. One experiment has, however, given some limited support to the possibility that the OP phosmet might modify the susceptibility of cells to the prion disease agent.").

Personal life
Purdey was born in Much Hadham, Hertfordshire, to what The Daily Telegraph describes as a "long line of gifted eccentrics." The Telegraph reports that an ancestor of his reportedly walked from Inverness to London to set up Purdey's gunsmiths, and that, after suffering shell shock during the First World War, his grandfather, Lionel Purdey, lobbied Lord Kitchener to recognise shell shock as an illness that needed treatment.

He was educated at Haileybury College, Hertfordshire, but was reportedly expelled after his A-levels. He turned down a place at London University to study zoology and psychology and, according to  The Guardian, "embarked on a kind of post-hippie bucolic existence."

In his mid-twenties, he set up an organic dairy farm, first in Ireland, and later in Pembrokeshire, on which he bred a herd of pedigree Jersey cattle. He wrote on his website that he introduced semen from New Zealand, Denmark, and Canada, to produce a "high fat, high yielding, pasture-fed Jersey cow" with an ability to produce milk from a "self-sufficient arable/legume-grass rotational system with minimal reliance upon purchased in concentrate feed." In 1997, one of his cows was the highest yielding Jersey cow in the UK, with 10,150-litre lactation, after she had been sold to a conventional farm. He is reported to have enjoyed playing the saxophone to his cows to keep them calm.

He married Carol MacDonald in 1974, a marriage that produced a son and a daughter. When that relationship broke up, he set up home with Margaret Unwin, with whom he had four daughters and two sons. They married one year before his death. He died of a brain tumour on 12 November 2006 on his farm in Elworthy, West Somerset.

Reputation
His anti-establishment views, his doggedness, and his willingness to educate himself brought him some high-level contacts in the UK, including the Prince of Wales and Lord King, the former defence secretary, who regarded Purdey's work as a "classic piece of scientific investigation." It was King who, in April 1993, formally alerted the Ministry of Agriculture to Purdey's research, after Purdey forwarded King a letter from Professor Satoshi Ishikawa of Kitasato University, who wrote that Purdey's description "about Mad cows to organophosphates compounds and warble fly is exactly true."

Teresa Gorman, MP for Billericay, and Ted Hughes, the poet laureate, were also supporters, while readers of The Guardian contributed to a fund to help pay for his research into BSE and its human equivalent, Creutzfeldt–Jakob disease (CJD).

His legal victory attracted letters from farmers who believe that using OP compounds had caused them and their animals' health problems. Purdey began to educate himself about the science of OPs just as the first recorded case of BSE was confirmed. He became convinced there was a connection, in part because cattle in Britain had been given unusually high doses of OPs; and in part because the theory that BSE was spread by contaminated meat and bone meal (MBM) did not, he argued, explain why the disease was not occurring in countries that had imported the same MBM from the UK.

The Telegraph writes that public support for Purdey increased after the BBC aired a documentary about his theory in 1988.

His theories encouraged researchers to publish in 1999 the statistical correlations between the epidemiology of BSE in cattle, scrapie in sheep and vCJD in humans.

In 2001 the European Commission Health and Consumer Protection Directorate-General differentiated between BSE transmission and BSE susceptibility, stating that the main problem in determining factors that increase susceptibility to BSE was the very limited data set which could not substantially confirm or deny possible factors.

As more data and research has occurred, Purdey's theories still appear relevant although untested. As the incidence of BSE and vCJD returns to previous low levels, data which would be useful in determining susceptibility become sparse. Meanwhile, research emphasis on animal models has properly been focused on determining the modes of transmission. Purdey and others theorized possible similar causative factors such as the matching prions identified in later BSE and vCJD studies.

GM Watch reported that Purdey's research and field work indicates organophosphate and manganese exposure could increase the incidence of death, contrary to the claims of some corporations.

Papers by Purdey

"Auburn university research substantiates the hypothesis that metal microcrystal nucleators initiate the pathogenesis of TSEs," Med Hypotheses, 2005 Oct 12. 
"Metal microcrystal pollutants; the heat resistant, transmissible nucleating agents that initiate the pathogenesis of TSEs?," Med Hypotheses, 2005;65(3):448-77. 
"The pathogenesis of Machado Joseph Disease: a high manganese/low magnesium initiated CAG expansion mutation in susceptible genotypes?," J Am Coll Nutr, 2004 Dec;23(6):715S-29S. 
"Elevated levels of ferrimagnetic metals in foodchains supporting the Guam cluster of neurodegeneration: do metal nucleated crystal contaminants evoke magnetic fields that initiate the progressive pathogenesis of neurodegeneration?," Med Hypotheses, 2004;63(5):793–809. 
"Elevated silver, barium and strontium in antlers, vegetation and soils sourced from CWD cluster areas: do Ag/Ba/Sr piezoelectric crystals represent the transmissible pathogenic agent in TSEs?," Med Hypotheses, 2004;63(2):211-25. 
"Chronic barium intoxication disrupts sulphated proteoglycan synthesis: a hypothesis for the origins of multiple sclerosis," Med Hypotheses, 2004;62(5):746-54.  
"Does an infrasonic acoustic shock wave resonance of the manganese 3+ loaded/copper depleted prion protein initiate the pathogenesis of TSE?" Med Hypotheses, 2003 Jun;60(6):797–820. 
with Bounias M. "Transmissible spongiform encephalopathies: a family of etiologically complex diseases — a review," Sci Total Environ, 2002 Oct 7;297(1–3):1–19. 
"Does an ultra violet photooxidation of the manganese-loaded/copper-depleted prion protein in the retina initiate the pathogenesis of TSE?" Med Hypotheses, 2001 Jul;57(1):29–45.  
"Ecosystems supporting clusters of sporadic TSEs demonstrate excesses of the radical-generating divalent cation manganese and deficiencies of antioxidant co factors Cu, Se, Fe, Zn. Does a foreign cation substitution at prion protein's Cu domain initiate TSE?" Med Hypotheses, 2000 Feb;54(2):278–306. 
"High-dose exposure to systemic phosmet insecticide modifies the phosphatidylinositol anchor on the prion protein: the origins of new variant transmissible spongiform encephalopathies?," Med Hypotheses, 1998 Feb;50(2):91–111.  
"The UK epidemic of BSE: slow virus or chronic pesticide-initiated modification of the prion protein? Part 2: An epidemiological perspective," Med Hypotheses. 1996 May;46(5):445-54 
"The UK epidemic of BSE: slow virus or chronic pesticide-initiated modification of the prion protein? Part 1: Mechanisms for a chemically induced pathogenesis/transmissibility," Med Hypotheses, 1996 May;46(5):429-43. 
"Are Organophosphate Pesticides involved in the Causation of Bovine Spongiform Encephalopathy (BSE)? Hypothesis based upon a Literature Review and Limited Trials on BSE Cattle," J. Nutritional Med., 1996 4 43-82.This paper questions the conventional wisdom that spongiform encephalopathies, particularly bovine spongiform encephalopathy (BSE), are solely due to ‘infection’ with an ultrafiltrable particulate protein called a prion. The literature is reviewed and data and circumstantial evidence are presented to support the hypothesis that the BSE epidemic was initiated as a result of a combination of factors—genetic, nutritional and chronic exposure to mutagenic organophosphate pesticides which disrupt the genetic pathway of prion protein synthesis. Possible mechanisms are discussed and the broader implications for modern farming practices inspected.
"Mad Cows and Warble Flies," Ecologist. 1994 24 (3) 100–104.
"Degenerative Nervous Diseases and chemical Pollution," Ecologist, 1994 24 (3) 100–104.
"Mad Cows and Warble Flies: a Link between BSE and Organophosphates?," Ecologist. 1992 22 52–57.
"BSE," Ecologist, 2002 32 (9) 33–37.
"The manganese loaded/Copper depleted bovine brain fails to neutralise incoming shockbursts of low frequency infrasound; The Origins of BSE?" Journal of Cattle Practice ( J of British Cattle Veterinary Association ), 2002 October, Vol 10 (4) p 311-335.
with Bounias M. "TSEs; a family of etiologically complex diseases," The Science of the Total Environment, 2002 297 (1–3) pp. 1–19.

Notes

Further reading

"Tributes to Mark Purdey", markpurdey.com
Monbiot, George. "Mad cows, Bretons and manganese", The Guardian, 23 November 2000.
"Farmer says chemicals cause BSE", BBC News, 2 April 1998.
, BBC documentary, 2001.
Phillips, M.E. (Lord), The BSE Inquiry: The Report, Volume 11. (the "Phillips Inquiry") Archived at: http://webarchive.nationalarchives.gov.uk/20060715141954/http:/bseinquiry.gov.uk/index.htm
Connor, Steve. "Mark Purdey: One-man BSE campaigner", The Independent, 17 November 2006.

1953 births
2006 deaths
Deaths from brain cancer in England
British activists
21st-century British farmers
People from Much Hadham
People educated at Haileybury and Imperial Service College
People from West Somerset (district)
Organic farmers
20th-century British farmers